The following are the national records in athletics in Haiti maintained by its national athletics federation: Fédération Haïtienne d'Athlétisme Amateur (FHAA).

Outdoor
Key to tables:

+ = en route to a longer distance

h = hand timing

A = affected by altitude

Men

Women

Indoor

Men

Women

Notes

References
General
World Athletics Statistic Handbook 2022: National Outdoor Records
World Athletics Statistic Handbook 2022: National Indoor Records
Specific

External links

Haiti
Records
Athletics
Athletics